The following is a list of countries by exports of aircraft components. Data is for 2012, in millions of United States dollars, as reported by The Observatory of Economic Complexity. Currently the top 21 countries are listed.

References
atlas.media.mit.edu - Observatory of Economic complexity - Countries that export Aircraft Parts (2012)

Aircraft component
Aerospace
Aircraft components